Grande Sido is one of three departments in Moyen-Chari, a region of Chad. Its capital is Maro.

Departments of Chad
Moyen-Chari Region